Theskelomensor is a genus of air-breathing land snails, terrestrial pulmonate gastropod mollusks in the family Trochomorphidae.

Species 
The following species are recognised in the genus Theskelomensor:
 Theskelomensor creon
 Theskelomensor lizardensis

References

 WMSDB info on  the authority

Endodontidae
Taxonomy articles created by Polbot